Mathieu Joseph (born February 9, 1997) is a Canadian professional ice hockey winger for the Ottawa Senators of the National Hockey League (NHL). He was selected by the Tampa Bay Lightning in the fourth round, 120th overall, of the 2015 NHL Entry Draft. Joseph won back-to-back Stanley Cups with the Lightning in 2020 and 2021.

Early life
Joseph was born on February 9, 1997, in Laval, Quebec, Canada to parents Frantzi Joseph and France Taillon. His father played and coached hockey for many years while his mother France was a competitive athlete in her youth. His father is of Haitian descent while his mother is White. His younger brother Pierre-Olivier is a defenceman for the Pittsburgh Penguins.

Playing career

Juniors
Joseph was selected by the Saint John Sea Dogs in the 2013 Quebec Major Junior Hockey League entry draft in the third round, 51st overall. He began to play for the Sea Dogs at the midway point of the 2013–14 season. His first goal with the team came in a 2–0 win over the Val-d'Or Foreurs. In his second season with the Sea Dogs, Joseph became the sixth player in team history to score five points in a regular season game. He also finished fourth in team scoring that season with 42 points. On June 27, 2015, the Tampa Bay Lightning selected Joseph in the fourth round, 120th overall, of the 2015 NHL Entry Draft.

On December 24, 2016, the Lightning signed Joseph to a three-year, entry-level contract. At the time of his signing, Joseph had played in 176 career games with the Sea Dogs during which he scored 80 goals and 171 points. During the 2016–17 playoffs, Joseph was named Canadian Hockey League Player of the Week after scoring two goals and three assists in two games. Joseph went on to help the Sea Dogs capture the President's Cup as QMJHL champion over the Blainville-Boisbriand Armada in a four-game sweep. The Sea Dogs went on to lose in the semifinals to the Ontario Hockey League's Erie Otters in the 2017 Memorial Cup.

Professional

Tampa Bay Lightning
Joseph began his professional career in the 2017–18 season with the Tampa Bay Lightning's American Hockey League (AHL) affiliate, the Syracuse Crunch. He had a strong rookie season with the Crunch, including being named CCM/AHL Rookie of the Month for March 2018, during which he scored 4 goals and 10 assists for 15 points over 12 games; he also had a seven-game scoring streak within that span. Joseph finished the season with 15 goals and 38 assists for 53 points, leading the Crunch in regular season assists and points. Joseph also had three goals and seven points in seven Calder Cup playoff games.

At the conclusion of the Lightning's training camp ahead of the 2018–19 season, Joseph found out he had made the opening night roster from general manager Julien BriseBois—before boarding the team's charter plane after a 3–2 Lightning win against the Florida Panthers, BriseBois informed Joseph he had made the roster. On October 6, 2018, Joseph made his NHL debut in a 2–1 Lightning win against the Florida Panthers at Amalie Arena. On October 16, he scored his first career NHL assist and point in a 4–2 Lightning win over the visiting Carolina Hurricanes. On November 4, Joseph scored his first NHL goal in a 4–3 Lightning overtime win over the Ottawa Senators away at the Canadian Tire Centre.

Joseph was one of the eight players called up to the Lightning for their training camp prior to the 2020 Stanley Cup Playoffs. Following the murder of George Floyd and shooting of Jacob Blake, Joseph worked alongside goaltender Curtis McElhinney in creating a mask to represent social justice. The end product featured Black athletes who were trailblazers in the fight for equality, a fist flanked by the words Black Lives Matter and a Martin Luther King Jr. quote.

Ottawa Senators
On March 20, 2022, just a day before the trade deadline, Joseph was traded along with a 2024 fourth-round draft pick by Tampa Bay to the Ottawa Senators in exchange for forward Nick Paul. On April 1, 2022, Joseph registered his first hat trick versus goaltender Alex Nedeljkovic in a 5–2 win over the Detroit Red Wings. In eleven games with the Senators, Joseph scored four goals and twelve points.

As a restricted free agent in the following off-season, Joseph was re-signed by the Senators to a four-year, $11.8 million contract extension on July 29, 2022.

International play

On April 29, 2019, Joseph was named to make his senior debut for Team Canada at the 2019 IIHF World Championship held in Slovakia. He helped Canada progress through to the playoff rounds before losing the final to Finland to finish with the Silver Medal on May 26, 2019. Joseph finished the tournament posting 1 goal and 2 points in 10 games.

Career statistics

Regular season and playoffs

International

Awards and honours

References

External links
 

1997 births
Living people
Black Canadian ice hockey players
Canadian ice hockey right wingers
Ice hockey people from Quebec
Ottawa Senators players
People from Chambly, Quebec
Saint John Sea Dogs players
Stanley Cup champions
Syracuse Crunch players
Tampa Bay Lightning draft picks
Tampa Bay Lightning players